The McMonies Barn, near Huron, South Dakota, was built in 1915. It was listed on the National Register of Historic Places in 2004.

It is a wood-framed feeder barn with a gambrel roof, on a cement foundation.  It has also been known as the Mentzel Barn.

References

Barns in South Dakota
National Register of Historic Places in Beadle County, South Dakota
Buildings and structures completed in 1915